Ceratophysa rosea is a species of sea urchins of the Family Pourtalesiidae. Their armour is covered with spines. Ceratophysa rosea was first scientifically described in 1879 by Alexander Emanuel Agassiz.

See also 

 Centrostephanus tenuispinus
 Ceratophysa ceratopyga
 Chaetodiadema africanum

References 

Animals described in 1879
Holasteroida